Onslow Beach is a  stretch of undeveloped beach at Marine Corps Base Camp Lejeune in Onslow County, North Carolina, USA. It has been used at various times for practice amphibious landings by the U.S. Navy. Presently, it is used as a recreational area by the Camp Lejeune community.

External links 
 Camp Lejeune's Onslow Beach Recreation Area website.

Landforms of Onslow County, North Carolina
Beaches of North Carolina